Ferry Weiss was a male Austrian international table tennis player.

Table tennis career
He won two bronze medals at the 1933 World Table Tennis Championships and the 1935 World Table Tennis Championships in the Swaythling Cup (men's team event).

He was coached by Paul Flussmann at his Vienna club.

See also
 List of table tennis players
 List of World Table Tennis Championships medalists

References

Austrian male table tennis players
World Table Tennis Championships medalists